Eduardo Barriobero y Herrán (1875 in La Rioja – 1939) was a lawyer and activist in the Confederación Nacional del Trabajo.

During the Spanish Civil War he became the presiding judge of the anarchists' "People's Tribunal" in Barcelona. He soon ran afoul of the Republican government, who accused him of embezzling some of the fines he collected.

He was captured by the Francoists in 1939, and in his subsequent trial he denied being an anarchist, saying "I am not an anarchist. I am a radical anticlerical Freemason." However, his pleas did him no good, and he was executed by firing squad.

References

1875 births
1939 deaths
People from La Rioja
Republican Union Party (Spain) politicians
Members of the Congress of Deputies of the Spanish Restoration
Members of the Congress of Deputies of the Second Spanish Republic
Confederación Nacional del Trabajo members
Spanish people of the Spanish Civil War (Republican faction)
20th-century Spanish lawyers
Executed Spanish people
People executed by Francoist Spain
People executed by Spain by firing squad